The Grammy Award for Best Gospel Vocal Performance, Male was awarded from 1984 to 1990.  From 1984 to 1989 it was titled the Grammy Award for Best Gospel Performance, Male.

Years reflect the year in which the Grammy Awards were presented, for works released in the previous year.

Winners and nominees

References

Grammy Awards for gospel music